Lefkimmi (Greek: Λευκίμμη) may refer to several places in Greece:

Lefkimmi, a town in the island of Corfu 
Lefkimmi, Evros, a village in the municipality of Soufli